KLM Helikopters was a Dutch civil helicopter operator founded in 1965, and was wholly owned subsidiary of KLM Airlines.

History
Also known as KLM Noordzee Helikopters the company provided offshore support flights, charters, and search and rescue. Their fleet consisted of seven Sikorsky S-61N's, four Sikorsky S-76B's, two Sikorsky S-58T's and two MBB Bo 105's. In 1991 the company expanded when Era Helicopters a division of Era Aviation acquire a 49% of KLM, and provided them with growth in Alaska region. until the company was sold to Schreiner Airways in 1998.

Accidents
On May 10, 1974 KLM Noordzee Helikopters Sikorsky S-61N PH-NZC crashed en route to an oil rig in the North Sea. None of the two crew and four passengers survived. The probable cause was a failure in one of five rotor blades due to metal fatigue.
On December 29, 1990 a Sikorsky S-61N was in a hover when serious vibrations were experienced. After touchdown one of the main rotor blades struck the fuselage and detached before the engines were shut down, no injuries were reported.

References 

Defunct airlines of the Netherlands
Airlines established in 1965
Airlines disestablished in 1998
Defunct helicopter airlines